EIU may refer to:
 Eastern Illinois University, in Charleston, Illinois, United States
 Economist Intelligence Unit, a British research and advisory company
 Eurasia International University, in Yerevan, Armenia